The Ministry of Foreign Affairs ('MOFA') is a ministry in the government of Myanmar responsible for the country's foreign relations. It also operates embassies and consulates in 44 countries. It is headed by Than Swe, appointed by military leader Min Aung Hlaing.

List of ministers

History
During World War II, the British administration retreated to India. In 1942, the foreign affairs is served by Defence Department. After World War II, Defence and External Affairs Department was established and directly served by counsellor of the governor.

In 1946, it was under the executive council and served by General Aung San, the vice chair of that council. Later, the Myanmar Representatives led by General Aung San and British Government agreed to act the foreign cases according to Myanmar.

The Department of Foreign Affairs was established on 17 March 1947 under General Aung San. The first secretary was Shwe Baw.

On 4 May 1948, it was renamed Foreign Office and the secretary became permanent secretary. On 25 May 1967, it became Ministry of Foreign Affairs.

Departments and heads of departments

 Director General:ASEAN Affairs Department: Ye Kyaw Mya
 Director General:Consular and Legal Affairs Department: Aye Ko
 Director General:Political Department: Aung Ko
 Director General:International Organizations and Economic Department: Marlar Than Htike 
 Director General:Planning and Administrative Department: Aung Kyaw Zan
 Director General:Protocol Department: Wunna Han
 Director General:Strategic Studies and Training Department: Aung Myint
 Director General:Union Ministry Office: Chan Aye

List of deputy ministers
 Hla Phone (1969–1974)
 U Win (1974–1978)
 Tin Ohn (1978–1983)
 Hla Shwe (1983–1985)
 Saw Hlaing (1985–1988)
 Ohn Gyaw (1989–1991)
 Khin Maung Win (1991–2004)
 Kyaw Thu (2003–2009)
 Maung Myint (2004–2012)
 Myo Myint (2011–2012)
 Thant Kyaw (2012–2016)
 Zinyaw (2012–2014)
 Tin Oo Lwin (2014–2016)
 Kyaw Tin (2016–2017)
 Kyaw Myo Htut (2021–present)

See also
 Foreign relations of Myanmar

References

External links
  Ministry of Foreign Affairs

Foreignffairs
Myanmar
Foreign relations of Myanmar